The Bobby Broom Trio is an American jazz trio based in Chicago, Illinois, that was founded by guitarist Bobby Broom in 2009 with bassist Dennis Carroll and drummer Kobie Watkins.  Drummer Makaya McCraven was an alternate for live performances and joined the group as its regular drummer in 2014.  The group's albums include Bobby Broom Plays for Monk (Origin, 2009), Upper Westside Story (Origin, 2012), and My Shining Hour (Origin, 2014).  It has appeared at the Chicago Jazz Festival and at clubs in Chicago and around North America.

The album My Shining Hour peaked at No. 3 on the JazzWeek charts and was put into the consideration round for a 2015 Grammy Award.

References

American jazz ensembles from Illinois
Musical groups established in 2009
American musical trios